Paul Aiken Flanders (1890 – September 21, 1944), was an American businessman, real estate developer, and Lieutenant in the United States Navy. He developed Outlands in
Carmel-by-the-Sea, California that is listed on the National Register of Historic Places. He founded the Carmel Land Company that developed Hatton Fields, an unincorporated community southeast of downtown Carmel-by-the-Sea.

Early life 

Flanders was born in 1890, in Chicago, Illinois. He attended Lewis Institute at the University of Illinois Chicago. He took his post-graduate studies at the Darmstadter Technical Hochscule in Germany prior to World War I. During the war, he was lieutenant in the United States Navy, commander of submarine chasers in the North Sea from Inverness Mine Deopot, Scotland. He saw service in Russia after the Armistice of 11 November 1918 and remained in the United States Navy Reserve in the 1920s and 1930s.

Flanders married Gladys Marjorie Johnson (1889–1915) on October 2, 1912, in Cook County, Illinois, and they had one daughter together, Alicia Clarke Flanders (1914–1984). His wife Gladys died on February 21, 1915, in a Providence hospital in Detroit, Michigan, at the age of 25.
When he left the service in 1918, he went into manufacturing in New York where he met Grace Johnson Livingston (1881–1967). They were married on November 25, 1920, in Manhattan, New York City. They had one son together, Barnett "Barry," who died at the age of 11 on March 23, 1933, in Carmel-by-the-Sea. Her first marriage was to Professor Burton Livingston, a plant pathologist at Johns Hopkins University in Baltimore, Maryland. She divorced Livingston in 1918.

In 1924, Flanders appeared in the three-act children's play Mr. Bunt,  by playwright Ira Mallory Remsen at the Forest Theater in Carmel-by-the-Sea. He played the Gateman in the maple tree. He was also the character Jim Giddings, in the play The Bad Man by Porter Emerson Browne, put on by the Carmel Arts and Crafts Club Theater in 1926.

Career

Paul and Grace Flanders came from New York to Carmel-by-the-Sea in 1923, to build a home and start a business in real estate development. Grace was familiar with Carmel as she had purchased land in the Eighty Acre Tract, adjacent to the old Hatton's property, from the Carmel Development Company in 1920.

Outlands

The two-story  Tudor Revival style home was named Outlands, due to its location on a hillside overlooking Carmel Valley to the southeast, the Carmel Mission, and Point Lobos to the southwest. The Flanders Mansion lies at the end of a long driveway at 25800 Hatton Road surrounded by the upper end of the Mission Trail Nature Preserve. Flanders hired an outside architect, Henry Higby Gutterson, to design their residence and local contractor Fred Ruhl to build it. Light grey interlocking Thermotite blocks, produced by the Carmel Thermotite Company, were used to build the home.

While the Outlands was under construction, the Flanders rented from their contractor Fred Ruhls, who owned a home Pebble Beach home. In 1925, a fire destroyed the Ruhl house and they were forced to rent a house in Carmel until their Outlands home was completed. The Outlands property was completed by June 1925.

Carmel Land Company

In 1925, Flanders became the president of the Carmel Land Company and helped develop Hatton Fields, southeast of Carmel-by-the-Sea's city limits. He purchased  of grazing land from the Hatton estate for $100,000.

The new company formed an office on Ocean Avenue between Louis S. Slevin's general merchandise store and the Carmel Bakery. Paul Flanders was president, Ernest Schweninger was secretary, and Peter Mawdsley was the treasurer. Flanders used his Outlands home as a model for the subdivision he planned to develop.

Stockholders in the Carmel Land Company were Flanders, Ernest Schweninger, Harry Leon Wilson, Charles King Van Riper, Fred Ruhl, and Carmel Martin.

Re-enlisted in US Navy

Flanders re-enlisted in the U.S. Navy at the outbreak of World War II, in September 1940 at the Naval Mine school at Yorktown, New York. His rank was lieutenant commander. He was then was assigned command of the Mine Patrol Force, 12th Naval District and stationed at Treasure Island, San Francisco. 

Flanders became a member of the Manzanita Club, the American Legion, and the Masonic Lodge.

Death

Flanders died on September 21, 1944, from a heart attack, in Washington, D.C., at the age of 54. He had gone on official business from the Treasure Island Naval Base at Treasure Island to Washington to inspect a navy yard. Funeral services were held at Del Monte Chapel at Hotel Del Monte with full naval honors. He was survived by his wife, daughter, two brothers and two nephews. Grace Flanders lived at the Outlands for the rest of her life. She died on January 20, 1967, having been a resident of Carmel for the past 45 years.

Legacy
In 1972, The City of Carmel purchased the Flanders Mansion and adjoining 14.9 acres from the Flanders heirs for $275,000. In 1980, part of the property, adjacent to the Flanders Mansion, became the Lester Rowntree Native Plant Garden at 25800 Hatton Road. The non-profit organization Flanders Foundation was established in 1998 to preserve, enhance, and maintain the city owned  the Flanders Mansion and Mission Trail Nature Preserve.

See also
 Timeline of Carmel-by-the-Sea, California

Notes

References

External links

 Lester Rowntree Native Plant Garden
 Outlands in the Eighty Acres
 National Register of Historic Places in Monterey County
 Mission Trail Nature Preserve

1890 births
1944 deaths
People from California
People from Carmel-by-the-Sea, California
Carmel-by-the-Sea, California